The Mirage Celerity is an American two-seat cabin monoplane designed by Larry Burton and with plans for home building sold by Mirage Aircraft of Tucson AZ, United States.

Design and development
The Celerity is a side-by-side two-seat low-wing cabin monoplane built from a mixture of composites and wood. Nominally powered by a  Lycoming O-320-B1A piston engine and with a retractable conventional landing gear.

Operational history
In September 2014 three examples were registered in the United States with the Federal Aviation Administration, although a total of four had been registered at one time.

Specifications

References

Notes

Bibliography

External links

Celerity
1980s United States civil utility aircraft
Homebuilt aircraft
Low-wing aircraft
Aircraft first flown in 1985